"Work Bitch" (edited for radio as "Work Work") is a song by American singer Britney Spears released as the lead single for her eighth studio album, Britney Jean (2013). It was written by Spears, will.i.am, Otto Knows, Sebastian Ingrosso, Anthony Preston and Ruth-Anne Cunningham. The song's production was handled by Ingrosso, Jettman and Adams, while vocal production was done by Adams and Preston. "Work Bitch" made its premiere on September 15, 2013, on iHeartRadio and select Clear Channel radio stations and was released as the lead single from the album on September 16, 2013, by RCA Records from the record alongside a clean version titled "Work Work".

"Work Bitch" is an EDM song containing mostly spoken lyrics, where Spears repeatedly exhorts "bitches" to "get to work". "Work Bitch" garnered critical acclaim, with praise drawn towards its production and female empowerment lyrics. It received several certifications from multiple countries. "Work Bitch" debuted and peaked at number 12 on the Billboard Hot 100. Outside of the United States, "Work Bitch" peaked within the top ten of the charts in 14 countries, including Canada, France, Germany, and the United Kingdom.

An accompanying music video for "Work Bitch" was directed by Ben Mor and filmed in Malibu, California and released in October 2013. It was reportedly the second-most-expensive music video of all time and has generated acclaim from critics, who praised Spears' dancing and the visual cinematography.

Background and release
Previously, in 2012, Spears and will.i.am collaborated on the song "Scream & Shout"; will.i.am was later announced in March 2013 as the executive producer for Spears' eighth studio album. In preparation for the single and album, Spears began working with a vocal coach and choreography collaboratively. "Work Bitch" was confirmed by Spears on September 7, 2013, during the video's filming. On August 20, 2013, Spears' official website launched a countdown titled "All Eyes on Me" counting down to September 17, 2013, which lead fans to speculate that this was in fact the single title. In response, Spears told fans that new music was coming "much sooner than you think".

On September 10, 2013; Spears confirmed "Work Bitch"s worldwide radio premiere for September 16, 2013, at 6p.m. ET on her official Twitter account, following up with a second tweet, "Work Bitch will be available on @iTunesMusic that night at 12:01am ET, Sept 17th... are u ready?! #YouBettaWorkB #1Week". On September 11, Spears revealed the writers of the song. The next day, Spears revealed the official single cover. The artwork features her posing in front of a vanity mirror, wearing a bedazzled leotard complete with feathered shoulders. A small sign can be seen behind her reading "Welcome to Fabulous Las Vegas", referencing her Las Vegas residency. The song leaked in full on September 15, 2013, one day before it was due for release on iHeartRadio and was therefore premiered a day earlier than scheduled. A clean version of the song, titled "Work Work" has also been released. A CD single of the song was released in Germany on October 18, 2013.

Composition

"Work Bitch" was written by Spears with will.i.am and Anthony Preston, and features a beat from DJ Otto Knows. Knows is managed by Swedish House Mafia member Sebastian Ingrosso, who also received a songwriting credit; however, Ingrosso revealed he did not write the lyrics. "Work Bitch" is an EDM song written in common time in the key of E minor, at a tempo of 128 beats per minute, wherein Spears, repeatedly exhorts "bitches" to "get to work". It starts with a basic club beat, with a monotone taunting chorus: "You want a hot body? / You want a Bugatti? / You want a Maserati? / You better work bitch!" Spears alludes to the luxuries she has attained due to her strong work ethic: "You want a Lamborghini? / Sip martinis? / Look hot in a bikini? / You better work bitch!" and "You wanna live fancy? / Live in a big mansion? / Party in France?" 

According to Miriam Coleman of Rolling Stone, it "features mostly spoken lyrics, [and] serves as a testament to the fine things a strong work ethic can bring about". Idolator contributor Christina Lee thought that the song "sounds like the lights-out after-party" to RuPaul's 1993 debut single "Supermodel (You Better Work)". will.i.am commented that the song "is a reflection of Britney moreso than [Britney Jean]. The album is what the album is, but we felt that song needed to come out to keep the foundation on what Britney represents. But it shouldn't reflect the album—an album is a body of work as a collective. If we had to pick a song like, 'Oh, what song fits every color of the record,' you shouldn't do that… We felt that song represents 'Piece of Me', that Britney oomph."

Critical response
A writer for Billboard described the track as a "full-on club banger with Spears giving fans the secret to her success". Writing for MuuMuse, Bradley Stern complimented the song as a "thrilling, thunderously bold slice of forward-thinking dance-pop". A reviewer for Popjustice called the track "amazing", and suggested that the lyrical content "has the right attitude for a Blackout 2.0 sort of album". Michael Cragg from The Guardian felt that "Work Bitch" is a "pretty relentless onslaught that reflects pop's current love for chucking in everything up to and including the kitchen sink", but felt that Spears' personality "[made] sure she hasn't been fully obliterated by will.i.am's production sledgehammer". Chris Eggertsen from HitFix called that it was a "perfect club track", but questioned how it would perform on mainstream radio. However, Sal Cinquemani from Slant Magazine gave a negative review for the song, opining that it "follows the current EDM model of painfully aggressive, treble-heavy beats, harsh synths, and tuneless hooks, but makes even 'Scream & Shout' sound like a melodic feast". Caryb Ganz of Rolling Stone noted that "will.i.am draws up the perfect nü-Britney blueprint: a squelchy thumper that's light on singing and heavy on hilarious directives barked in an English accent... Blasts of clubby synths do most of the work, while Britney winks at the world". About.com writer Bill Lamb called the single forward thinking and gave the single praise, stating, "This is a single that is pushing boundaries and will likely feel more exhilarating each time you listen".

Commercial performance
The song debuted on the Billboard Hot 100 at number 12, marking Spears' 31st song on the chart and the fifth highest debut of her career on the chart, and her seventh in the top 20. It also marked Spears' 19th top 20 single and overall her 23rd top 40 single. It also entered the top 10 on the Hot Digital Songs chart at number six. "Work Bitch" sold 174,000 copies in its first week, marking Spears' highest first-week sales since her 2011 number-one single "Hold It Against Me". With its debut on the Mainstream Top 40 at number 25, the song marks Spears' 31st chart entry, pushing her past Mariah Carey (30) for the second-most entries to the chart's October 3, 1992, launch. In its second week, the song fell to number 41 on the Billboard Hot 100. The following week, it climbed back to number 13 after the release of the accompanying music video. As of July 2016, "Work Bitch" has sold 967,000 copies in the United States.

In the United Kingdom, "Work Bitch" debuted and peaked at number seven on the UK Singles Chart on November 10, 2013 – for the week ending date November 16, 2013 – falling 30 places to number 37 the following week. The song also peaked at number two on the UK Dance Chart.

"Work Bitch" also peaked within the top ten of the charts of 14 countries.

Music video

Development

The music video for "Work Bitch" was shot by Ben Mor, who had previously worked on the video for Spears and will.i.am's 2012 single, "Scream & Shout". The visual effects for the music video were provided by HOAX Films, who completed sky replacements shots, set extensions and cleanup. It is produced for Black Dog Films/Little Minx, executive producer Coleen Haynes and producer Tony McGarry. Spears revealed she was rehearsing for something "top secret next week", on August 29. Filming took place in Malibu, California, on September 7, 8, 9 and 10. On the first day, Spears tweeted, "Hot day on set... ;) A little dirty, little flirty, danced my ASS off. Stoked for tomorrow!" following the tweet up with a still of herself in a yellow and black bra with long, black gloves. Spears released a sneak peek of the video on September 26, 2013, through her Instagram account. The full version of the music video premiered on October 1 on The CW Television Network, during the second day broadcast of the iHeartRadio Music Festival. Upon rumors that the production costs for the making of the music video were expensive, director Ben Mor refuted all claims on the production costs. However, industry insiders from Planet Hollywood reported that the music video's total production and editing costs amounted to $6.5 million, as stipulated by the contract Spears signed in her residency requirements, which could have made it the second-most-expensive music video of all time. Later, the director disclaimed the costs as the production was not near the $6.5 million at all. The original airing of the premiere in the United States was viewed by 1.09 million viewers and received a Nielsen rating of 0.4/1 in the key adults 18–49 demographic, up 33 percent from the previous night.

Spears revealed that the video was supposed to have more sexual scenes; however, she edited many scenes out "because I am a mother and because, you know, I have children, and it's just hard to play sexy mom while you're being a pop star as well. I just have to be true to myself and you know, feel it out when I do stuff." Mor replied to the singer's comment, saying he never forced or made her do anything she didn't want to during the shoot, and continued, "she's in complete control the whole time. It was easy to make a racier cut only because of the extras and the cutaways, and that's it". Spears manager Larry Rudolph and father Jamie Spears also released a statement, revealing that "Britney is never pressured into anything. She reviews all creative and for her 'Work Bitch' video she discussed toning down some parts in finding a balance of sexy and being a mom."

Synopsis

Mor said the video is not story-based as Spears' previous videos, but it has "more of a theme ... rather than a narrative. This one is basically [saying] 'The queen is back and she's about to show all these bitches how it's done.' It's her being really fierce and taking back her throne in a way." The video opens with several intercalated shots of the singer, who portrays a dominatrix, and her dancers in front of a pool, and a car, and in the middle of the desert. After singing "Party in France? You better work bitch", we see Spears at the top of Planet Hollywood Resort and Casino dancing. According to Bruna Nessif of E! Online, we also see Spears channeling the erotic romance novel Fifty Shades of Grey throughout the video, with the singer "whipping some woman ... and using a riding crop". Product placement for Spears' fragrance Fantasy and Beats Pill wireless speakers (being used as a bit gag) can also be seen.

Reception
Bruna Nessif of E! Online praised the singer's figure, saying the video is "everything Britney Spears fans could want and more", adding, "There is just so much going on, we don't even know where to start! But how about Brit's bangin' body? Yes, let's start there." Mike Wass of Idolator compared the desert scenes to the ones of Ciara's "Got Me Good" (2012), and wrote, "not only does [Spears] look absolutely gorgeous in an array of skimpy outfits, there's some life in her eyes and, dare I say it, a spring in her step". The Hollywood Reporter contributor Sophie Schillaci thought the video was a return to Spears' early 2000s, comparing it to "I'm a Slave 4 U" (2001) and "My Prerogative" (2004). A reviewer for Fuse called the video a "sleek and sexy" return to form, while Ryan Roschke of PopSugar commented that "even though the premise of the video is a little unclear, we're going to go ahead and give Brit an 'A' for 'Abs.'" Similarly, Sharnaz Shahid of Entertainment Wise thought "the pop princess oozes sex appeal" and "is back to her old provocative ways".

Jocelyn Vena of MTV felt Mor "wasn't lying" when he said the video would show a more adult side of Spears, and argued the clip proves the singer is "ready for her next era to launch". Samantha Highfill from Entertainment Weekly described the video as a prequel to Beyoncé's "Run the World (Girls)", saying that it had similar desert setting, "sexy" clothes, wavy hair, wild animals and both are all-female dance numbers. She further viewed Spears' video as "offensive to women" but concluded that "However, the more I thought about the songs and watched the videos, the more I realized that even though Beyoncé's song is all about the power of women, Britney's is too. Sure, Britney is a little more blunt in finding a way to, er, 'encourage' women to work hard, but the song is about the fact that women can and should work hard and find success." A mixed review came from HitFix's Melinda Newman, who wasn't too impressed with the production, noting, however, that Spears' "dancing has certainly improved" and that "it's clear that she's definitely doing so much better than she was just a few years ago". In the United Kingdom, the music video was banned from airing on music video networks before 10pm, for displaying "a number of risqué scenes featuring bondage gear and Spears whipping her dancers". The country's MTV and The Box networks requested a clean edit of the video to air through the day, as a heavily censored version of the song titled "Work" is also available. This music video was Vevo certified on March 16, 2014, becoming Spears' fourth Vevo certified clip.

Live performances, usage in media and legacy

Spears performed "Work Bitch" as the opening act of her Las Vegas residency, Britney: Piece of Me (2013–17). The performance begins with the singer "descending from the sky in a globe-like cage". After exiting the cage, she performs the choreography from the music video, accompanied by 16 alien-masked dancers. Spears sports a "skin-tight, sequined bodysuit" for the performance, similar to the diamond outfit she wore during the "Toxic" music video (2004). Keith Caulfield of Billboard said "Spears was particularly energetic in the number, which seemed to delight the crowd". Caryn Ganz of Rolling Stone considered it the best moment of the concert, noting that "Spears stomped around the stage with authority and nailed her choreography, setting a hopeful tone for the night". On May 22, 2016, Spears performed the song in a medley of her greatest hits at the 2016 Billboard Music Awards. It was also the opening number at Spears's set on the iHeartRadio Music Festival on September 24, and on the 2016 Apple Music Festival on September 27, 2016. The song was also streamed live along with "Toxic" from Spears' final Britney: Piece of Me show date on December 31, 2017, on ABC's Dick Clark's New Year's Rockin' Eve to an audience of 25.6 million.

On October 14, 2013, Nicole "Snooki" Polizzi and her dance partner Sasha Farber performed "Work Bitch" on the season 17 of Dancing with the Stars. Polizzi explained that the performance was "a celebration of me being a mother, a woman, a new person, and working seven days a week to provide a great life for my family". A week later, Polizzi and Farber also performed the track on The Ellen DeGeneres Show. The song was parodied on the Comedy Central animated series, South Park. Seen in the episode, "The Hobbit", the song was used during a gym montage where most of the 4th grade girls and Timmy were "working out" by manipulating photos of themselves in Photoshop and using Instagram filters. "Work Bitch" was also featured on TV series New Girl, in the episode "Menus", during a scene where Coach (Damon Wayans Jr.) tries to get Nick (Jake Johnson) in shape. It was used in the 2019 movie Matthias & Maxime, and was featured in the dance-rhythm video game, Just Dance 2019.

In a 2020 research, done by Sportsshoes.com, it was found out that the song was the most popular song for running, "it sets a decent running pace of around 3.5 miles an hour and offers some motivational quotes to enjoy as you go".

Track listings

CD single
 "Work Bitch" – 4:07
 "Work Bitch" (Instrumental) – 4:07

Digital download
 "Work Bitch" – 4:07

Clean digital download
 "Work Work" – 4:07

Credits and personnel
Credits adapted from the liner notes of the "Work Bitch" CD single.

Recording
Recorded and engineered at KBK Studios, Stockholm, Sweden
Mixed at Record Plant, Los Angeles, California, U.S.
Vocals recorded and engineered at Glenwood Studio, Burbank, California, U.S.

Personnel

Britney Spears – lead vocals and backing vocals, songwriter
will.i.am – songwriter, executive producer, producer, vocal producer, guest vocals and backing vocals
Otto Knows – songwriter, producer, instrumentation, programming, recording, engineer
Sebastian Ingrosso – songwriter, producer, instrumentation, programming, recording, engineer
Anthony Preston – songwriter, vocal producer, backing vocals
Ruth-Anne Cunningham – songwriter
Myah Marie – backing vocals
Joe Peluso – mixer
Julian Prindle – vocal recording, vocal engineer
Jacob Dennis – assistant vocal engineer
Chris Kahn – assistant vocal engineer

Charts

Weekly charts

Monthly charts

Year-end charts

Certifications and sales

Release history

See also 
List of most expensive music videos

References

2013 singles
Britney Spears songs
Electronic dance music songs
RCA Records singles
Song recordings produced by will.i.am
Songs written by Anthony Preston (record producer)
Songs written by Britney Spears
Songs written by Otto Knows
Songs written by RuthAnne
Songs written by Sebastian Ingrosso
Songs written by will.i.am
2013 songs